Phyllostegia is a genus of flowering plant in the mint family, Lamiaceae, first described in 1840. It is native to certain islands in the Pacific (Hawaii, Tonga and the Society Islands, although it appears to be extinct in the Society Islands).. Phyllostegia glabra var. lanaiensis, became extinct before 2021  and was delisted from the Endangered Species Act based on extinction.

Species
 Phyllostegia ambigua (A.Gray) Hillebr - Hawaii Big Island, Maui
 Phyllostegia bracteata Sherff - Maui
 Phyllostegia brevidens A.Gray - Hawaii Big Island, Maui
 Phyllostegia electra C.N.Forbes - Kauai
 Phyllostegia floribunda Benth - Hawaii Big Island
 Phyllostegia glabra (Gaudich.) Benth. - Hawaiian Islands
 Phyllostegia grandiflora (Gaudich.) Benth - Oahu
 Phyllostegia haliakalae Wawra - Maui, Molokai
 Phyllostegia helleri Sherff - Wai'alae Valley of Kauai
 †Phyllostegia hillebrandii H.Mann ex Hillebr - Maui but extinct
 Phyllostegia hirsuta Benth. - Oahu
 Phyllostegia hispida Hillebr. - Molokai
 Phyllostegia kaalaensis H.St.John - Oahu
 Phyllostegia kahiliensis H.St.John - Kauai
 Phyllostegia knudsenii Hillebr. - Kauai
 Phyllostegia macrophylla (Gaudich.) Benth. - Hawaii Big Island, Maui
 Phyllostegia mannii Sherff - Molokai, Maui
 Phyllostegia micrantha H.St.John - Oahu 
 Phyllostegia mollis Benth. - Hawaiian Islands  (Maui, Oahu)
 Phyllostegia parviflora Benth. - Hawaiian Islands
 Phyllostegia pilosa H.St.John - Hawaiian Islands
 Phyllostegia racemosa Benth. - Hawaiian Islands
 Phyllostegia renovans W.L.Wagner - Kauai
 †Phyllostegia rockii Sherff - Maui but extinct
 Phyllostegia stachyoides A.Gray - Hawaiian Islands
 †Phyllostegia tahitensis Nadeaud - Tahiti but extinct
 Phyllostegia tongaensis H.St.John - Tonga
 †Phyllostegia variabilis Bitter - Midway Islands but extinct
 Phyllostegia velutina (Sherff) H.St.John - Hawaii Big Island
 Phyllostegia vestita Benth. - Hawaii Big Island
 Phyllostegia waimeae Wawra - Kauai
 Phyllostegia warshaueri H.St.John - Hawaii Big Island
 Phyllostegia wawrana Sherff - Kauai
 Phyllostegia × yamaguchii Hosaka & O.Deg. - Oahu    (P. glabra × P. hirsuta)

References

 
Lamiaceae genera
Taxonomy articles created by Polbot